Sophie, Duchess of Edinburgh,  (born Sophie Helen Rhys-Jones, 20 January 1965) is a member of the British royal family. She is married to Prince Edward, Duke of Edinburgh, the youngest brother of King Charles III.

Sophie grew up in Brenchley, Kent, and later attended West Kent College, training as a secretary. She then worked in public relations, representing firms across the UK, Switzerland and Australia before opening her own agency in 1996. She met Edward in 1987 while working for Capital Radio; they began dating in 1993. Their engagement was announced in January 1999, and they married on 19 June at St George's Chapel, Windsor Castle. The couple have two children: Lady Louise Mountbatten-Windsor and James Mountbatten-Windsor, Earl of Wessex, who are respectively fifteenth and fourteenth in line to the British throne.

In 2002, Sophie closed her business interests and began full-time work as a member of the royal family. She is the patron of over 70 charities and organisations, including Childline and the London College of Fashion. She undertakes over 200 engagements each year, including visits to schools, universities and military bases. Her charity work primarily revolves around people with disabilities, women's rights, avoidable blindness and agriculture.

Early life and career
Sophie Helen Rhys-Jones was born at Radcliffe Infirmary, Oxford, on 20 January 1965 into a middle-class family. Her father, Christopher Bournes Rhys-Jones (born 1931), is a retired sales director for an importer of industrial tyres and rubber goods. Her mother was Mary (née O'Sullivan; 1934–2005), a charity worker and secretary. She has an elder brother, David (born 1963), and was named after her father's sister, Helen, who died in a riding accident in 1960. Her godfather, actor Thane Bettany, was her father's stepbrother; both men spent their early life in Sarawak, North Borneo, then a British Protectorate ruled by the White Rajahs. 

She descends from King Henry IV of England. She is related to the family of the Viscounts Molesworth through her grandmother, Margaret Rhys-Jones (née Molesworth; 1904–1985), who was the great-granddaughter of the Rev. John Molesworth, himself the father of Sir Guilford Molesworth and the great-grandson of Robert Molesworth, 1st Viscount Molesworth.

Rhys-Jones was raised in a four-bedroom 17th-century farmhouse in Brenchley, Kent. She began her education at Dulwich Preparatory School, before moving on to Kent College, Pembury, where she was friends with Sarah Sienesi, with whom she subsequently shared a flat in Fulham and who later became her lady-in-waiting. Rhys-Jones then trained as a secretary at West Kent College, Tonbridge.

She began a career in public relations, working for a variety of firms, including four years at Capital Radio, where she was assigned to the press and promotions department, as well as public relations companies The Quentin Bell Organisation and MacLaurin Communications & Media. She also worked as a ski representative in Switzerland and spent a year travelling and working in Australia. In 1996, Rhys-Jones launched her public relations agency, RJH Public Relations, which she ran with her business partner, Murray Harkin, for five years.

Prior to her marriage, Rhys-Jones lived at Coleherne Court.

Marriage and children

While working at Capital Radio, Rhys-Jones met Prince Edward, the youngest son of Queen Elizabeth II and Prince Philip, Duke of Edinburgh, for the first time in 1987 when he was dating her friend. She met him again at a promotion shoot for the Prince Edward Summer Challenge to raise money for charity in 1993, and the two began their relationship soon afterwards. In December 1993 and amid growing speculation about whether they were planning to marry, Edward wrote a letter to newspaper editors, in which he denied any wedding plans and asked the media to respect their privacy. Edward proposed to Sophie at a vacation in the Bahamas in December 1998 and their engagement was announced on 6 January 1999. Edward proposed to her with an engagement ring featuring a two-carat oval diamond flanked by two heart-shaped gemstones set in 18-carat white gold. The ring was made by Asprey and Garrard (now Garrard & Co) and is worth an estimated £105,000. Sophie, who was reportedly close to the Queen from the beginning of her relationship with Edward, was allowed to use the royal apartments at Buckingham Palace prior to her engagement.

The wedding took place on 19 June of the same year at St George's Chapel, Windsor Castle, a break from the weddings of Edward's older siblings, which were large, formal events at Westminster Abbey or St Paul's Cathedral. On the day of their marriage, Prince Edward was created a hereditary peer as Earl of Wessex with the subsidiary title of Viscount Severn (derived from the Welsh roots of his wife's family).

The couple spent their honeymoon at Balmoral Castle. Following their union, the Earl and Countess moved to Bagshot Park, their home in Surrey. While their private residence is Bagshot Park, their office and official London residence is based at Buckingham Palace.

In December 2001, the Countess was taken to the King Edward VII Hospital after feeling unwell. It was discovered that she was suffering from an ectopic pregnancy and the foetus had to be removed. Two years later, on 8 November 2003, she prematurely gave birth to her daughter, Lady Louise, resulting from a sudden placental abruption that placed both mother and child at risk, and the Countess had to undergo an emergency caesarean section at Frimley Park Hospital, while the Earl of Wessex rushed back from Mauritius. The Countess returned to Frimley Park Hospital on 17 December 2007, to give birth, again by caesarean section, to her son, James (then Viscount Severn, now Earl of Wessex).

Public life

The Countess of Wessex's first overseas tour after her marriage was to the Canadian province of Prince Edward Island in 2000.

In December 2011, the Countess of Wessex joined her husband visiting troops in Afghanistan. In February and March 2012, the Earl and Countess visited the Caribbean for the Diamond Jubilee, visiting Saint Lucia, Barbados, Saint Vincent and the Grenadines, Grenada, Trinidad and Tobago, Montserrat, Saint Kitts and Nevis, Anguilla and Antigua and Barbuda. Highlights of the tour included the 50th Anniversary Independence Day celebrations in Saint Lucia, a joint address from both houses of the Barbados Parliament and a visit to sites affected by the recent volcanic eruptions in Montserrat. In June 2012, as part of the Queen's Diamond Jubilee celebrations, the Earl and Countess of Wessex, represented the Queen during a three-day tour to Gibraltar. The couple attended a Queen's Birthday Parade and toured Main Street, in the historic old town.

In 2013, the couple visited South Africa. Later that year, the Countess made solo trips to India and Qatar as the patron of the sight-saving charity Orbis UK. She made a similar visit to Bangladesh in November 2017. The Countess, as Colonel-in-Chief of Corps of Army Music, visited The Countess of Wessex's String Orchestra at the Royal Artillery Barracks, in London. On 3 March 2014, the Queen approved the title of "The Countess of Wessex's String Orchestra" for the new Army String Orchestra in recognition of the Corps of Army Music's Colonel-in-Chief. In November 2014, the Countess was in Zambia representing the Queen at the State funeral of the late President of Zambia, Michael Sata.

On 26 March 2015, she attended the reburial of Richard III of England in Leicester Cathedral. In May 2015, the Countess represented the Queen in the 70th anniversary celebrations to mark the Liberation Day of the Channel Islands. The Countess delivered a message from the Queen, who paid tribute to the island's continued allegiance and loyalty to the Crown. The Countess visited Canada and the United States in November 2015. While in Toronto, she criss-crossed across the city, making stops at the Royal Agricultural Winter Fair and the UHN's Toronto General Hospital and Toronto Western Hospital, of which she is patron. Sophie then travelled to New York City, paying an emotional visit to the National September 11 Memorial & Museum. The Countess also made an appearance at an Armistice Day service at the Queen Elizabeth II September 11th Garden, which was opened in commemoration of the 67 British victims of the attack. The Countess later attended the 100 Women in Hedge Funds Gala dinner in Manhattan.

The Earl and Countess of Wessex toured Canada in June 2016, visiting Ontario, Manitoba, Saskatchewan and Alberta. The couple visited a variety of places in and around Regina, Saskatchewan before attending the Globe Theatre's 50th anniversary gala. In March 2017, the Countess embarked on a 4-day visit to Malawi as Vice-Patron of The Queen Elizabeth Diamond Jubilee Trust, visiting programmes to end avoidable blindness and champion young leaders. On 9 May 2017, the Countess attended King Harald and Queen Sonja of Norway's 80th Birthday Celebrations on behalf of the royal family. The Earl and Countess of Wessex represented the Queen at the 50th Anniversary Celebrations of Sultan Hassanal Bolkiah's Accession to the Throne of Brunei in October 2017. On 30 November 2017, the Countess visited the 'Making for Change' fashion training and manufacturing unit, a fashion training and manufacturing unit established by the Ministry of Justice and London College of Fashion at HM Prison Downview as patron of the London College of Fashion During her visit, the Countess met staff and prisoners, including female inmates, and awarded participants with certificates as part of their training programme.

An avid supporter of charities that deal with learning disabilities, the Countess made a solo trip to Belfast in January 2018 to visit a number of charities that she had supported through her work over the last decade, including Mencap's children's centre. She also opened the new dementia-friendly unit of Northern Ireland Hospice, the first of its kind in the UK. The Earl and Countess of Wessex visited Sri Lanka in February 2018 to celebrate the 70th Anniversary of Independence, Sri Lanka–United Kingdom relations, the Commonwealth, education and young people. In October 2018, the Earl and Countess of Wessex toured the Baltic states.

In March 2019, the Countess travelled to New York City to attend the 63rd session of the United Nations Commission on the Status of Women (CSW). The annual event brought together more than 9,000 gender equality representatives from around the world. The CSW is "the principal global intergovernmental body exclusively dedicated to the promotion of gender equality and the empowerment of women." From 29 April to 3 May 2019, the Countess, Vice-Patron of the Queen Elizabeth Diamond Jubilee Trust, visited India in her final overseas tour as vice-patron ahead of the Trust's planned closure in January 2020. The Countess saw the work the charitable foundation has supported to tackle avoidable blindness and heard about programmes successfully launched by Queen's Young Leaders.

In July 2019, the Earl and Countess, visited Forfar on their first official visit to the town since the Queen granted the Earl the additional title Earl of Forfar in March 2019. Later in October, the Countess visited Kosovo to meet victims of sexual violence after the Kosovo War and their families. By the end of 2019, Sophie had completed 236 official engagements. In March 2020, Sophie became the first member of the royal family to visit South Sudan. During the visit, which was requested by the Foreign and Commonwealth Office, the Countess of Wessex and Forfar met victims and survivors of gender-based violence and promoted their rights by meeting the female political leaders in the country.

In January 2022, the Countess went on a solo visit to Qatar in her capacity as the global ambassador for the International Agency for the Prevention of Blindness (IAPB) to support the organisation's '2030 in Sight' initiative and visit projects by the Qatar Fund and Orbis International aimed at improving eye tests and treatments in India and Bangladesh. As a supporter of the Women Peace and Security Network she met with Afghan women refugees who had been evacuated from the country following the 2021 Taliban offensive. In March 2022, Sophie went on a four-day solo trip to New York City, visiting the Queen Elizabeth II September 11th Garden and Consuls General from across the Commonwealth to mark the Commonwealth Day. She also delivered the keynote address on women's rights in Afghanistan at an event hosted by the UN Women and the Georgetown Institute for Women, Peace and Security.

In April 2022, the Earl and Countess of Wessex and Forfar toured Saint Lucia, Saint Vincent and the Grenadines, and Antigua and Barbuda to mark the Queen's Platinum Jubilee. Their planned visit to Grenada was postponed after talks with the island's government and governor general, and the couple expressed their hopes to visit the country on a later date. In October 2022, she visited the Democratic Republic of the Congo to engage with projects preventing sexual and gender-based violence in conflict, becoming the first member of the royal family to visit the country. The tour also included visits to Rwanda, Botswana, and Malawi. After her husband was created Duke of Edinburgh on his 59th birthday, Sophie and Edward visited Edinburgh to meet with members of the Ukrainian and Eastern European communities in the city, some of whom were displaced following the Russian invasion of Ukraine.

Charity work and patronage

The Earl and Countess of Wessex established their foundation The Wessex Youth Trust in 1999 to support initiatives and charities that help children and young people. After twenty years of operation, the Wessex Youth Trust was renamed the Earl and Countess of Wessex Charitable Trust in 2019 and its management was transferred to the Private Office of the Earl and Countess of Wessex and Forfar. It was announced that the Trust's broad charitable objectives would not change, however, their future efforts would be aimed towards supporting a different range of charities.

In 2000, she became patron of a number of organisations, including Foundation of Light (formerly Sunderland A.F.C Foundation) which develops educational and community programmes in northern England, based around football. Moved by the death of her friend Jill Dando in 1999, the Countess became a trustee of UCL Jill Dando Institute, an institute of crime science established in her name in 2001. As a full-time member of the royal family, part of her focus became charities that dealt with communications difficulties, including Southampton General Hospital, and the New Haven Trust in Toronto, a learning centre for children with autism. In 2003, she became patron of Tomorrow's People Trust, which helps the disadvantaged to find work, housing and a place in society. In February 2003, Sophie became patron and ambassador of Meningitis Now, a charity that supports meningitis patients and raises awareness of the disease. Later that month, she became patron to The Scar Free Foundation, a medical research charity coordinating funds in wound healing, burns and cleft research. In 2003, she succeeded Queen Elizabeth The Queen Mother as patron of the Royal College of Speech and Language Therapists.

The Countess, who was a Brownie as a child, became the new president of Girlguiding UK in 2003, following the death of Princess Margaret in February 2002. She established the Women in Business Group in 2003 to support the Duke of Edinburgh's Award and reach more young people to help them develop skills that can transform their futures. The Countess became president of the Brainwave Centre in 2003, a charity providing therapy for children with developmental delay. In June 2003, she became patron of the Greater London Fund for the Blind, which raises funds for smaller charities for visually impaired people in London. In August 2003, the Countess received patronage of the National Autistic Society, passed down from the Princess Royal. In 2004, she joined St John Ambulance as grand president, and heads the work of St John's County Presidents, who provide a variety of support for their local St John members. She was associated with ChildLine for many years, preceding her appointment as their first ever royal patron in 2005. In 2006, she lent her support to the Born in Bradford research project, which investigated causes of low birth weight and infant mortality between 2007 and 2010. In September 2006, she was appointed an Honorary Fellow of the Royal College of Obstetricians and Gynaecologists. In the same year, she became patron of England Hockey.

The Countess is a supporter of agriculture, farming and food production and held the position of show president of the Royal Bath and West Show in 2010 before becoming vice patron in 2011. She is also patron of the Association of Show and Agricultural Organisations and has been patron of the Border Union Agricultural Society since its bicentennial year in 2012. The Countess works to support the 'Campaign for Wool', which was set up by the then-Prince of Wales, and aims to promote the use of British wool. During her 2013 trips to India, and Qatar, the Countess visited numerous facilities in her capacity as patron of Vision 2020: The Right to Sight and ambassador for IAPB, in order to raise awareness about preventable blindness. Her work on the issue has been described as influential in creating the Qatar Creating Vision initiative. In 2013, the Countess became the first ever patron of the London College of Fashion and was announced as the royal patron of British Wheelchair Basketball. In June 2013, she was appointed global ambassador for the Duke of Edinburgh's International Award Foundation, an umbrella body co-ordinating organisations running the Duke of Edinburgh's Award worldwide. She has been the founder and chairman of the Duke of Edinburgh's Award Women's Network Forum since January 2014, whose goal is the advancement of gender balance and equality by influencing business leaders, inspiring the next generation and sharing best practice. In June 2014, the Countess was appointed the patron of Ubunye Foundation, based in the Eastern Cape, South Africa, a rural development trust dedicated to unlocking the potential of rural communities.

On the Countess's 50th birthday, she became vice patron of the Queen Elizabeth Diamond Jubilee Trust, a charitable foundation established in 2012 for Queen Elizabeth II's Diamond Jubilee. The trust was a time-limited foundation and closed on 31 January 2020. In February 2015, the Queen gave a joint reception to celebrate the 50th birthdays of the Earl and Countess, as well as their patronages and affiliations, at Buckingham Palace. Elizabeth, accompanied by the couple, met key supporters, staff, volunteers and alumnus from the charities of their patronage and presidency, as well as representatives from their various military appointments. In November 2015, 100 Women in Hedge Funds announced that the Countess will serve as Global Ambassador of 100WF's Next Generation initiatives. In September 2016, the Countess took part in a cycling challenge from the Holyrood Palace to Buckingham Palace for the Duke of Edinburgh's Award Diamond Challenge. The ride raised more than £180,000 for the Award, which was celebrating its 60th anniversary. Linking Environment And Farming named the Countess as its new honorary president in October 2016. In November 2016, she was announced as Women of the Future's official ambassador, which supports and celebrates the successes of young women. In December 2016, the Countess participated in ICAP charity day in order to raise money for Shooting Star Chase, a children's hospice of which she is patron. During the same month. after the Queen stepped down from her position as patron of numerous charities, Sophie replaced her as the principal patron of NSPCC, Blind Veterans UK and British Cycling Federation.

The Countess was elected president of the Devon County Agricultural Association in February 2017. In May 2017, as patron of the British Bobsleigh and Skeleton Association the Countess attended its 90th anniversary and commemorative athlete awards dinner. The Ice Maiden, five British Army women, received royal patronage from the Countess for their ambitious coast-to-coast ski expedition across Antarctica in October 2017. The team aimed to inspire women and girls everywhere to challenge perceptions and grow their ambitions. In January 2018, the Countess became the Royal Patron of the Nursing Memorial Appeal. The Appeal aims to create a memorial dedicated to the 1,500 nurses who gave their lives in First and Second World Wars. In February 2018, Westmorland Agricultural Society welcomed the Countess as its president. In January 2019, the Countess became the patron of the Thames Valley Air Ambulance, which saved her life during her ectopic pregnancy in 2001.
On 29 January, the Countess was elected president of the Royal Smithfield Club, which promotes the education and knowledge to advance best practice in the meat and livestock industry.
On International Women's Day March 2019, the Countess officially announced her involvement in taking a stand against sex crimes in conflict zones, joining Angelina Jolie to work with the Preventing Sexual Violence in Conflict Initiative (PSVI) as well as Women, Peace and Security (WPS) formed 20 years ago to tackle the impact of armed conflict on women and girls, and to promote the positive role women play in building peace and stability. On 25 April 2019, it was announced that the Countess, along with her husband and her brother-in-law, the Duke of York, have each been appointed vice president of the annual Royal Windsor Horse Show. In May 2019, she took over the patronage of the Chartered Management Institute from Prince Philip, Duke of Edinburgh.

In April 2020, the Countess helped Rhubarb, a catering company, in preparing and delivering food to NHS staff amidst the coronavirus pandemic, an initiative organised by Ian Wace. The Countess has also volunteered at local food banks, including the Hope Hub, in Surrey and delivered parcels to the homeless during the pandemic. In September 2020, Sophie, alongside her husband and children, participated in the Great British Beach Clean at Southsea Beach in support of the Marine Conservation Society.

In February 2021, as grand president of St John Ambulance, the Countess started working as a care volunteer at an NHS vaccination centre. In May 2021, Sophie become royal patron of Wellbeing of Women, a charity focused on all areas of women's reproductive health across a woman's life course, from menstrual health to menopause. A patron of this charity, she later discussed her own struggles with menopause and how it affected her memory. In July 2021, Princess Alexandra handed over the patronage of The Guide Dogs for the Blind Association to Sophie. In December 2022, Sophie was honoured at the Georgetown Institute for Women, Peace and Security, where she received the Hillary Rodham Clinton Award for her work concerning sexual violence in war zones.

Public image and style
At the start of her relationship with Prince Edward, Sophie was referred to as "the girl next door", and noted for her successful career and ordinary background. In the early years of her marriage, Sophie faced public scrutiny for her business interests, and was often compared to the late Diana, Princess of Wales, who had died two years earlier. On her transition to becoming a full-time royal, she later stated: "Certainly it took me a while to find my feet. The frustration was I had to reduce my expectations of what I could actually do. I couldn't turn up at a charity and go, right, I think you should be doing this, because that's what I was used to doing in my working life. I had to take a really big step back and go, OK, they want you to be the icing on the cake, the person to come in to thank their volunteers and funders, not necessarily to tell them how to run their communications plan."

The Countess has since been cited as an under-the-radar "stabilizing influence" and a "safe pair of hands". She has been said to have a low-key approach to royal engagements, and often drives herself to and from events. Amanda Pullinger stated to  Town and Country, "She actually presents herself as an ordinary person and I think that is increasingly what the royal family needs to do." She has also been noted for her long-term work on "gritty" subject matters such as gender-based violence in conflict, and trips to "difficult areas", such as South Sudan and Sierra Leone. The Countess's engagements gained significant attention from the public post-Megxit, with her charity work and style choices receiving increased commentary and analysis. Writer Ingrid Seward states that the Countess "is not a self-publicist....She looks good, without being over-the-top, and she's not craving celebrity. You often wouldn't know she had carried out all those engagements."

The Countess was not initially prominent for her fashion, but eventually began to develop her own style and has worn outfits by many notable designers. The Countess has exclusively worn Jane Taylor millinery designs since 2009 on numerous occasions. In a Marie Claire interview, Taylor described her first royal commission: "My first royal client was the Countess of Wessex, and it was quite nerve-racking. But she wears such lovely clothes and she always looks so fabulous, so it's quite easy to design for her. Since she came to see me, she's never worn any other milliner's hats, which is a big compliment. I was really excited, honored, and slightly nervous." Alongside the Princess of Wales and the Duchess of Sussex, Sophie has been named one of the most stylish members of the royal family. The Countess is particularly known for wearing different combinations of hats and coats, and favours silk dresses and frocks. Describing her style in an interview by Sunday Express Sophie said: "It's about my charities, but I recognize that I'm on display. [...] When you walk into a room, yes, people are going to talk about what you're doing there, but they're also going to want to know what you're wearing". She also revealed that she has never had a stylist of her own and that she makes her fashion choices herself. In 2015, the Countess was named on Vanity Fairs Best Dressed List. Together with the then-Duchess of Cambridge, the Countess hosted the Commonwealth Fashion Exchange reception at Buckingham Palace during the 2018 London Fashion Week.

Privacy and the media

Violation of privacy
In May 1999, less than a month before her wedding, The Sun published a photo of a topless Sophie with her Capital Radio colleague Chris Tarrant, which was taken during a business trip to Spain in 1988. Buckingham Palace immediately issued a statement saying, "This morning's story in The Sun is a gross invasion of privacy and cannot be regarded as in the public interest. It has caused considerable distress." Prime Minister Tony Blair also condemned the publication of the photograph. The Palace made an official complaint to the Press Complaints Commission (PCC). According to Sophie's business partner the incident had left her "distressed", and she was reportedly "devastated" and felt "she was 'letting the side down' before her wedding". Tarrant later said, "There was never, ever the slightest hint of romance between Sophie and myself, let alone these snidey insinuations." Following its publication, the newspaper issued a statement and apologised to Rhys-Jones and the next issue came out with the headline "Sorry, Sophie". It also said that it would again apologise to Sophie in a letter and donate all sale proceeds of the issue to her charities. The photo was sold to the tabloid by Kara Noble, a former friend and colleague of Sophie. Noble later apologised in the following months saying, "I just want to say sorry to everyone who was involved." Both she and the newspaper faced criticism from the public, and Noble was fired from her job at Heart 106.2 FM. The couple later decided not to make a formal complaint.

In 2011, close associates of Jonathan Rees, a private investigator connected to the News International phone hacking scandal, stated that he had penetrated Sophie and Edward's bank accounts and sold details about them to the Sunday Mirror.

Media sting
In April 2001, Sophie appeared in the media after she was misled in a meeting at the Dorchester by a News of the World reporter posing as an Arab sheikh, Mazher Mahmood, who was later exposed for perjury in Southwark Crown Court. It was claimed by the newspapers that during their "secretly taped" conversation, the Countess had insulted the royal family and politicians, calling the Queen "old dear" and criticising the leadership of prime ministers John Major and Tony Blair and Chancellor of the Exchequer Gordon Brown. She also reportedly commented on Prince Charles's relationship with his then-partner Camilla, arguing that a marriage would not be possible as long as the Queen Mother was alive. However, despite some initial reports, the paper acquitted her of referring to Cherie Blair as "absolutely horrid" and mocking Leader of the Opposition William Hague's appearance. Murray Harkin, Sophie's business partner who was also present at the meeting, was recorded discussing his sex life and cocaine use and boasting about Sophie's abilities in securing celebrities for various events. Tabloid newspapers claimed the Countess had sent apology letters to Blair, Hague and Prince Charles.

Buckingham Palace denied the accuracy of the reports, saying: "The Countess of Wessex, who is trying to pursue her own career, is obviously vulnerable to set-ups such as this." The Palace released a statement saying the reported comments were "selective, distorted and in several cases, flatly untrue". The Palace officials stated that the Countess had not insulted the Queen, the Queen Mother, or the politicians, while according to the Mail on Sunday four reliable sources had confirmed these reports. The News of the World attributed the negative reactions to the jealousy of the rival media, as the outlet had previously conducted an interview with Sophie in which she addressed the rumours about her difficulties in marriage and discussed her husband's sexuality. Sophie had reportedly agreed to the intimate interview on the condition that the newspaper would not publish transcript of the tapes. In a separate statement the Countess said she was "distressed by the carrying out of an entrapment operation" on her, but also regretted her "own misjudgment in succumbing to that subterfuge". Subsequently, in 2002, both the Earl and Countess announced that they would quit their business interests in order to focus on activities and official engagements on behalf of the royal family and aid the Queen in her Golden Jubilee year.

Jewellery  gifts
The Countess of Wessex has been criticised for accepting two sets of jewels from the royal family of Bahrain during an official day-long visit to the country in December 2011, as she and her husband returned to the UK from a trip to Afghanistan. She was given one set by Bahrain's king and a second set by the country's prime minister, Sheikh Khalifa bin Salman Al Khalifa. Her husband, the Earl, received a pen and a watch as well as a silk rug from the Crown Prince of Bahrain, Prince Salman bin Hamad al-Khalifa, who also gave the countess a silver and pearl cup. The value of the jewellery has not been estimated and its precise contents were not disclosed. Given concern about human rights abuses in Bahrain, this gift attracted controversy, with calls for the jewels to be sold, and the proceeds used for the benefit of the Bahraini people.

Critics said the Countess should sell the gems and give the proceeds to political protesters in Bahrain. Denis MacShane, then a Labour Member of Parliament (MP) and previously a Foreign Office minister, said: "Given the appalling suffering and repression of the Bahraini people, it would be a fitting gesture for the Countess of Wessex to auction these trinkets and distribute the proceeds to the victims of the regime."

Royal family guidelines and procedures relating to gifts, published by the government in 2003, state that "before accepting any gift, careful consideration should always be given, wherever practicable, to the donor, the reason for and occasion of the gift and the nature of the gift itself ... Equally, before declining the offer of a gift, careful consideration should be given to any offence that might be caused by such action."

Titles, styles, honours and arms

Titles and styles
Sophie was styled as "Her Royal Highness The Countess of Wessex" from her marriage in 1999 to 2023. On 10 March 2019, her husband was made Earl of Forfar, making her Countess of Forfar. She was at times referred to as the Countess of Wessex and Forfar, such as at the funerals of her father-in-law and mother-in-law. On 10 March 2023, her husband was created Duke of Edinburgh; since then, she has been known as "Her Royal Highness The Duchess of Edinburgh".

Honours

The rose cultivar Rosa 'Countess of Wessex' was named in her honour in 2004.

  2002: Queen Elizabeth II Golden Jubilee Medal
  2004: Royal Family Order of Queen Elizabeth II
  2005: Commemorative Medal for the Centennial of Saskatchewan
  2010: Dame Grand Cross of the Royal Victorian Order (GCVO)
  2012: Queen Elizabeth II Diamond Jubilee Medal
  2016: Canadian Forces Decoration (CD)
  2017: Service Medal of the Order of St John
 2021: Service Medal of the Order of St John (First Bar to the Service Medal)
  2022: Queen Elizabeth II Platinum Jubilee Medal
  2022: Dame Grand Cross of the Venerable Order of Saint John (GCStJ)
 2005–2022: Dame of Justice of the Venerable Order of Saint John (DStJ)

Foreign
  2015: Sash of the Order of the Aztec Eagle
  2017: Sultan of Brunei Golden Jubilee Medal

Honorary military appointments

 Canada
  2004: Colonel-in-Chief of the Lincoln and Welland Regiment
  2005: Colonel-in-Chief of the South Alberta Light Horse

 United Kingdom
  2003: Colonel-in-Chief of the Queen Alexandra's Royal Army Nursing Corps
  2005: Colonel-in-Chief of the Royal Corps of Army Music
  2006: Lady Sponsor of HMS Daring
  2007: Royal Colonel of the 5th Battalion The Rifles
  2008: Honorary Air Commodore Royal Air Force Wittering
  2022: Colonel-in-Chief of the Royal Electrical and Mechanical Engineers

Honorific eponym
 The Countess of Wessex Cup, an annual competition which sees regiments and military organisations affiliated with Sophie compete against each other in a series of challenges

Arms

Authored articles

References

External links

 The Duchess of Edinburgh at the official website of the British royal family
 The Countess of Wessex at the website of the Government of Canada
 .

1965 births
Living people
20th-century British people
21st-century British people
20th-century British women
21st-century British women
British Anglicans
British countesses
British public relations people
Dames Grand Cross of the Royal Victorian Order
Dames Grand Cross of the Order of St John
Duchesses of Edinburgh
Honorary air commodores
Sophie
Sophie, Countess of Wessex
People educated at Kent College, Pembury
People from Bagshot
People from Brenchley
People from Oxford
Sophie, Countess of Wessex
Wives of British princes